Alejandro Figueroa (born 18 August 1978) is a Colombian retired footballer who last played for W Connection F.C. of the TT Pro League in Trinidad and Tobago.

Career

Was signed by Ma Pau Stars in December 2009.

Rejoined former club W Connection in January 2013 for the upcoming season. 

Put in an immaculate performance in the 2013 Trinidad and Tobago Goal Shield final, making two penalty saves in the shoot-out to deny North East Stars the trophy.

References

Colombian footballers
Association football goalkeepers
Colombian expatriate footballers
TT Pro League players
Expatriate footballers in Trinidad and Tobago
Colombian expatriate sportspeople in Trinidad and Tobago
Living people
1978 births
W Connection F.C. players